Sant'Ilario in Campo is a village in Tuscany, central Italy, administratively a frazione of the comune of Campo nell'Elba, province of Livorno. At the time of the 2011 census its population was 157.

Sant'Ilario is located on the Elba Island and it is about 5 km from the municipal seat of Marina di Campo.

Bibliography 
 

Frazioni of Campo nell'Elba